Darby Wood Betts (June 5, 1912 – August 14, 1998) was an Episcopal priest who served as canon of the Cathedral of St. John the Divine from 1952 to 1955 during a major national scandal about the use of spanking on boy choristers.

References 
Obituary – Darby Wood Betts

Darby Betts, 86; Founded Episcopal Homes New York Times obituary

1912 births
1998 deaths
20th-century American Episcopalians